"Send Me an Angel" is a 1983 song by Australian band Real Life. The song was released in May 1983 as the band's debut single from their debut studio album Heartland. The song peaked in the top 10 in Australia and is the band's best-known song. This version peaked in early 1984 in the US at No. 29 on the Billboard Hot 100 chart. The song was No. 1 in Germany and New Zealand and Top 10 in other countries.

In the US, "Send Me an Angel '89" surpassed the original version from 1983. "Send Me An Angel '89" reached a peak of No. 26 on the Billboard Hot 100 chart in the summer of 1989 in the US.

The song features in the soundtracks of the American movies Rad (1986) and The Wizard (1989).  It also appears on the Non-Stop-Pop in-game radio station in the PC/Xbox One/PS4 versions of the 2013 video game Grand Theft Auto V.

Track listing
7" single (WRS-001)
Send Me an Angel – 3:53
Like a Gun – 3:16	
				
12" single
Send Me an Angel (Extended Dance Mix) – 5:40			
Send Me an Angel – 3:53		
Like a Gun – 3:14

12" Maxi-Single
Send Me An Angel (Extended Mix) – 5:43
Send Me An Angel – 3:53
Burning Blue – 4:43

Charts

Original version

Weekly charts

Year-end charts

"Send Me an Angel '89"

Cover versions
"Send Me an Angel" has been covered by various artists including:
Netzwerk on their 1992 EP Send Me an Angel
Pobi on her 1993 album Send Me An Angel
Atrocity on their 1997 cover album Werk 80
Zeromancer on their 2001 album Eurotrash
Thrice for the 2002 compilation Punk Goes Pop, which later appears on the 2005 compilation If We Could Only See Us Now
Deadstar Assembly on their 2003 self-titled debut album
The Quakes on their 2005 album Psyops
Gregorian on their 2006 album Masters of Chant Chapter V
Dirty on Purpose on their 2008 EP Like Bees
Missing Hours on their eponymous 2008 album.
Inverse Phase released "NES Me An Angel" on the 2012 chiptune album Retrocovered
Emily Zisman on her 2014 album Weeds & Wildflowers
XO Stereo on their 2015 EP The Struggle
Highly Suspect on their 2016 album The Boy Who Died Wolf
Christopher Anton on his 2021 compilation Genesis of Sound II

See also
List of number-one hits of 1984 (Germany)
List of number-one singles from the 1980s (New Zealand)

References

1983 songs
1983 debut singles
1989 singles
Real Life (band) songs
Curb Records singles
MCA Records singles
Number-one singles in Germany
Number-one singles in New Zealand